Tuslob buwa is a Cebuano street food which originated from the barangays of Pasil and Suba in Cebu City.

History
The first tuslob buwa is believed to have been consumed as early as around the 1950s and is done during the cooking of sinudlan (ground pork sausage) wherein the diners would gather the resulting foam in the frying oil with pusô (cooked rice in coconut leaves).

A second variant became popular around the 1960s that made use of the pork offals (ug ginhawaan na tuslob buwa). After cleaning the offals, it is seasoned with salt, garlic, black pepper, and bayleaf. The offals are then boiled for the preparation for cooking of adobo; the resulting stock from this boiling process would be set aside and be used for tuslob buwa. In the latter part of the 1960s, the sauce of humba would also become popular as tuslob buwa.

The modern recipe became popular around the 1970s and consists of pork brain (otok) sauteed in oil with onion, garlic, and soy sauce. Around 2014, the dish became more widely available with variants beginning to be served in nearby cities of Lapu-Lapu and Mandaue. It is also around this time that it started to be served and be featured in restaurants.

One restaurant, Azul, garnered controversy in 2020 for having the name tuslob buwa registered before the Intellectual Property Office of the Philippines as a trademark. Residents of barangay Pasil and Suba criticized and disputed the eligibility of this trademark registration.

Preparation
The ingredients are cooked in a wok (kawa) and simmered until the mixture becomes thick and produces bubbles. The dish is served with pusô (hanging rice) which the diners would dip in the prepared tuslob buwa. It is traditionally prepared as a communal food; the street food vendors (pungko-pungko) would cook the tuslob buwa in one wok where several people could share and the diners would pay by the pusô.

In popular culture
Barangay Suba in Cebu City first held its Tuslob Buwa Festival on January 9, 2015 and it has since been celebrated annually every January during the Santo Niño festivities.

Tuslob buwa was featured on the Netflix TV series, Street Food in the Cebu, Philippines episode.

References

External links

Philippine cuisine
Philippine pork dishes
Culture of Cebu
Street food in the Philippines
Visayan cuisine
Brain dishes